The 2022 Open de Oeiras II was a professional tennis tournament played on clay courts. It was the sixth edition of the tournament which was part of the 2022 ATP Challenger Tour. It took place in Oeiras, Portugal between 4 and 10 April 2022.

Singles main-draw entrants

Seeds

 1 Rankings are as of 21 March 2022.

Other entrants
The following players received wildcards into the singles main draw:
  Pedro Araújo
  Tiago Cação
  João Domingues

The following players received entry from the qualifying draw:
  Lucas Gerch
  Oscar José Gutierrez
  Ergi Kırkın
  Alexandar Lazarov
  Fábián Marozsán
  Alex Rybakov

Champions

Singles

  Gastão Elias def.  Alessandro Giannessi 7–6(7–4), 6–1.

Doubles

  Nuno Borges /  Francisco Cabral def.  Zdeněk Kolář /  Adam Pavlásek 6–4, 6–0.

References

2022 ATP Challenger Tour
April 2022 sports events in Portugal
2022 in Portuguese sport